is a Japanese manga artist born in Hokkaidō, Japan. She made her manga debut with The Monsters Collection in the June 1997 issue of Wings, published by Shinshokan. Her representative works include Asian Beat, Baku, The Demon Ororon and Demon Flowers.

Works

 Other titles
 Maybe Blue (not yet collected in a tankōbon release)
 Mephisto  (collected in Baku tankōbon)
 Monkey Magic (not yet collected in a tankōbon release)
 The Monsters Collection (debut work, not yet collected in a tankōbon release)
 Sugar (not yet collected in a tankōbon release)
 Yuki no Furu Machi (collected in Asian Beat tankōbon)

References

External links 
 

 
Living people
Manga artists from Hokkaido
Year of birth missing (living people)